Joan Valerie Bondurant (1918–2006) was an American political scientist and former spy for the Office of Strategic Services (OSS) during World War II.  She is best known as the author of Conquest of Violence: The Ghandian Philosophy of Conflict (1958), a book on Gandhian political philosophy.

Early life and intelligence work

Bondurant was born on 16 December 1918 in Great Bend, Kansas. She was gifted in the piano, and graduated from the University of Michigan with a degree in music.

When World War II broke out, she learned Japanese, and was sent to work for the OSS in India, arriving in New Delhi in May, 1944.

Scholarly career and later life
While in India, she met Mahatma Gandhi, and became interested in his nonviolent approach to politics. Returning to the US, Bondurant obtained a doctoral degree in political science at the University of California, Berkeley (1952).  She then published Conquest of Violence: The Ghandian Philosophy of Conflict (1958), a widely reviewed and influential book on Gandhian politics.

Later, she took a job teaching at University of the Pacific.

Her collection of personal and research papers was given to the Department of Rare Books, Special Collections, and Preservation of River Campus Libraries at the University of Rochester in 2012 and was opened to researchers in 2015.

Selected works

See also
Gene Sharp

References

External links
Sketches of India (autobiographical work of first India trip, with many photos)
At Bondurant family website
Finding aid for the Joan V. Bondurant Papers, 1918-2003, Rare Books Special Collections & Preservation Department, University of Rochester.

University of California, Berkeley alumni
American political philosophers
Writers from California
1918 births
2006 deaths
World War II spies for the United States
People of the Office of Strategic Services
Gandhians
University of the Pacific (United States) faculty
University of Michigan School of Music, Theatre & Dance alumni
People from Great Bend, Kansas
American women non-fiction writers